Nuvola61 (formerly called Nuvolari) is an Italy-based sports and entertainment television channel part of Gruppo LT Multimedia. Its primary focus is on motorsports, as inferred by its name taken from Italian driver Tazio Nuvolari.
Other properties that have been broadcast on the channel include the Spengler Cup (ice hockey), the Pro14 (rugby union) and Insane Championship Wrestling (professional wrestling).

External links 
 Nuvolari official website 

Sports television in Italy
Television channels in Italy
Television channels and stations established in 2000
Italian-language television stations